Yapo may refer to:
Grand-Yapo
Léonard Offoumou Yapo

See also 

Yaffo
Yape
Yappa